Senj (Hungarian and ) is a town on the upper Adriatic coast in Croatia, in the foothills of the Mala Kapela and Velebit mountains.

The symbol of the town is the Nehaj Fortress which was completed in 1558. For a time this was the seat of the Uskoks, who were Christian refugees from Ottoman Bosnia resettled here to protect the Habsburg borderlands. The Republic of Venice accused the Uskoks of piracy and declared war on them which led to their expulsion following a truce in 1617.

Senj is to be found in the Lika-Senj County of Croatia, the Roman Catholic Diocese of Gospić-Senj and the Roman Catholic Archdiocese of Rijeka.

History

Senj has apparently been inhabited since prehistoric times. A settlement called Athyinites in today's Senj was mentioned in Greek documents dated to 4th century BC. The Illyrian tribe Iapydes inhabited the area as it was located in Illyria.

Senia was a thriving town in the Roman province of Dalmatia, used by the Romans as a stronghold against the Illyrians in the 2nd century BC. After the fall of the Roman Empire, the Avars and the Croats eventually settled here in the 7th century AD.

The Catholic diocese of Senj was established in 1169. King of Hungary Béla III gave the town to the Knights Templar in 1184, and in 1271 it became the property of the Frankopan counts of Krk.

In 1248 the bishop of Senj was allowed by Pope Innocent IV to use the Glagolitic alphabet and the vernacular in liturgy. A Glagolitic printing press was set up in 1494 and produced the incunabula The Glagolic Missal and Spovid općena.

The military captaincy of Senj was established in 1469 in order to defend against the invading Ottoman and Venetian armies. The town sheltered thousands of refugees from nearby occupied areas. The Nehaj Fortress was completed in 1558 on the hill Nehaj, which at the time was outside of town. Today it is wholly within the town's borders. The wars with the Ottomans lasted well into the 17th century. During this time the Uskoks lived in Senj and occupied the fortress. They served an important purpose during the wars since they had small units of men rowing swift boats that proved to be very effective guerrilla forces. However, after the Uskok War with Venice, which ended in 1617, they were forbidden to settle in the area. Prince Radic was appointed Prince of Senj by king Rudolf emperor of Austria (1 December 1600). (Radic family) Native noble family from Lika region; members of the family were Uskok military leaders at the headquarters in Senj.

The 18th century brought some prosperity, especially with the construction of the Josephina (named after Emperor Joseph II) linking the Adriatic coast via Senj to Karlovac. The railway line built in 1873 between Fiume (Rijeka) and Karlovac did not pass by Senj which held back further development.

Until 1918, the town was part of the Austrian monarchy (Kingdom of Croatia-Slavonia, Lika-Krbava County after the compromise of 1867), in the Croatian Military Frontier (Regiment III).

In the fall of 1943, during World War II, when Fascist Italy capitulated, the Partisans took control of Senj and used it as a supply port. Subsequently, the Luftwaffe started bombarding the town. By the end of the year they had demolished over half of the buildings in town and inflicted heavy civilian casualties.

Climate

Senj has a temperate climate which is usually described as temperate Oceanic or Marine west coast, with mild, windy winters and relatively dry and warm summers. According to the Köppen climate classification it falls within a cool, dry-summer subtropical zone (Csb), with cool-summer Mediterranean characteristics such as its usually dry summers.

Economy

Modern Senj is a seaside tourist town. Primary industries are fishing, boating, and tourism.

Population

In 2011 the settlement of Senj had 4,810 inhabitants, while the whole administrative area of Town of Senj had 7,182 inhabitants.

Population by nationality:

 Croats 6,971 (97.06%)
 Serbs 66 (0.92%)
 Albanians 27 (0.38%)
 Bosniaks 24 (0.33%)
 Others 94 (1.31%)

There are 27 settlements in the Town of Senj and they include: Alan, Biljevine, Bunica, Crni Kal, Jablanac, Klada, Krasno, Krivi Put, Lukovo, Melnice, Mrzli Dol, Pijavica, Podbilo, Prizna, Senj, Senjska Draga, Starigrad, Stinica, Stolac, Sveta Jelena, Sveti Juraj, Velike Brisnice, Veljun Primorski, Volarice, Vrataruša, Vratnik i Vrzići.

Notable people
 Blaž Baromić (c. 1450 – 1505)
 Nikola Jurišić (1490 – 1545)
 Ivo Senjanin (c. 1571 – 1612)
 Pavao Ritter Vitezović (1652 – 1713)
 Ivan Paskvić (1754 – 1829)
 Vjenceslav Novak (1859 – 1905)
 Silvije Strahimir Kranjčević (1865 – 1908)
 Eugen Kvaternik
 Milan Moguš
 Vladimir Ćopić
 Sandra Šarić
 Edi Karić
 Domagoj Krajina

International relations

Twin towns – Sister cities
Senj is twinned with:

Gallery

References

External links

 Official website of the town of Senj
 Official website of the Tourist Board of Senj

 
Cities and towns in Croatia
Populated coastal places in Croatia
Populated places in Lika-Senj County
Illyrian Croatia
Cities in ancient Illyria